Girard is a city in Macoupin County, Illinois, United States. The population was 1,785 at the 2020 census, down from 2,103 in 2010.

History
Girard is named for Stephen Girard.

Geography
Girard is located in northeastern Macoupin County at  (39.445947, -89.781253). Illinois Route 4 passes through the center of town as Third Street, leading southwest  to Carlinville, the county seat, and north-northeast  to Springfield, the state capital.

The city drains west to tributaries of the East Fork of Otter Creek, flowing southwest to Hodges and then Macoupin Creek, a west-flowing tributary of the Illinois River.

Demographics

As of the census of 2000, there were 2,245 people, 864 households, and 565 families living in the city. The racial makeup of the city was 98.93% White, 0.13% African American, 0.13% Native American, 0.04% Asian, 0.09% from other races, and 0.67% from two or more races. Hispanic or Latino of any race were 1.11% of the population.

There were 864 households, out of which 34.0% had children under the age of 18 living with them, 48.0% were married couples living together, 12.4% had a female householder with no husband present, and 34.6% were non-families. 28.7% of all households were made up of individuals, and 15.2% had someone living alone who was 65 years of age or older. The average household size was 2.49 and the average family size was 3.07.

In the city, the population was spread out, with 26.5% under the age of 18, 8.5% from 18 to 24, 28.6% from 25 to 44, 19.3% from 45 to 64, and 17.1% who were 65 years of age or older. The median age was 36 years. For every 100 females, there were 94.0 males. For every 100 females age 18 and over, there were 87.5 males.

The median income for a household in the city was $31,806, and the median income for a family was $39,028. Males had a median income of $29,537 versus $22,266 for females. The per capita income for the city was $15,090. About 10.2% of families and 13.2% of the population were below the poverty line, including 19.8% of those under age 18 and 9.7% of those age 65 or over.

Recreation
Girard is located at the south end of the Sangamon Valley Trail right-of-way.

Notable people
Hardin B. Cloud, farmer, merchant, and Iowa state legislator; born in Girard
Charlotte Pierce, silent film actress; born in Girard
Fountain L. Thompson, U.S. senator for North Dakota in early 20th Century; raised in Girard

References

External links
Girard Chamber of Commerce

Cities in Illinois
Cities in Macoupin County, Illinois